Jastrzębia may refer to:

Jastrzębia, Lower Silesian Voivodeship (south-west Poland)
Jastrzębia, Kutno County in Łódź Voivodeship (central Poland)
Jastrzębia, Łęczyca County in Łódź Voivodeship (central Poland)
Jastrzębia, Łowicz County in Łódź Voivodeship (central Poland)
Jastrzębia, Tarnów County in Lesser Poland Voivodeship (south Poland)
Jastrzębia, Wadowice County in Lesser Poland Voivodeship (south Poland)
Jastrzębia, Świętokrzyskie Voivodeship (south-central Poland)
Jastrzębia, Grójec County in Masovian Voivodeship (east-central Poland)
Jastrzębia, Radom County in Masovian Voivodeship (east-central Poland)